The Napier Eland was a British turboshaft or turboprop gas-turbine engine built by Napier & Son in the early 1950s. Production of the Eland ceased in 1961 when the Napier company was taken over by Rolls-Royce.

Design and development
The Eland was first tested in 1953 in a Vickers Varsity aircraft. Further flight proving was carried out from 1955 using the first production Airspeed Ambassador 2.  The Eland was dropped from production when Napiers was acquired by Rolls-Royce Limited in 1961.

The Eland was used to power various aircraft including the Westland Westminster heavy-lift helicopter, the Canadair CL-66; a turbine-powered version of the Convair CV-340 for the Canadian military(later converted to Allison T-56 propjets after a number of engine failures),  and the Fairey Rotodyne gyrodyne. In the Rotodyne, the Eland powered the tractor propellers for forward flight and a compressor, via a clutch and shaft arrangement, to feed the rotor tip-jets with compressed air for vertical flight.

Variants
 Eland N.El.1  +  residual thrust, static at sea level ICAN conditions.
 Eland N.El.3 Powerplant for the Fairey Rotodyne driving the propeller and an auxiliary compressor to feed the rotor tip jets  +  residual thrust, static at sea level ICAN conditions.
 Eland N.El.4  +  residual thrust, static at sea level ICAN conditions.
 Eland N.El.6
 Eland N.El.7 The 504 adapted to helicopter / convertiplane, compressed air generator use.
 Eland E.211 The 504 adapted for mechanically driven helicopter rotors.
 Eland 504(N.El.6)
 Eland 508 504 with increased max continuous rating.

Applications

Turboshaft
Westland Westminster

Turboprop
Airspeed Ambassador
Canadair CC-109 Cosmopolitan (CL-66)
Convair CV-540
Fairey Rotodyne
Vickers Varsity (one aircraft as an engine test bed in 1954)

Engines on display
A turboshaft Eland is on display at the Helicopter Museum, Weston-super-Mare.

Specifications (Eland N.El.6)

See also

References

Notes

Bibliography

 Gunston, Bill. World Encyclopedia of Aero Engines. Cambridge, England. Patrick Stephens Limited, 1989.

External links

Atlantic Canada Aviation Museum - Napier Eland 504 information sheet
"Eland 1959" a 1959 Flight article

Eland
1950s turboshaft engines
Axial-compressor gas turbine engines